Avenue of Poplars at Sunset is an oil painting created in 1884 by Vincent van Gogh. It is held at the Kröller-Müller Museum in The Netherlands.

See also
 List of works by Vincent van Gogh

External links

References 

Paintings by Vincent van Gogh
1884 paintings
Collections of the Kröller-Müller Museum